The following events occurred in February 1965:

February 1, 1965 (Monday)
Rod Laver won the Western Australian Professional Championships for the second time, at Perth, defeating Pancho Gonzales 7–5, 11–9.
Television commercials were shown by the Swiss Broadcasting Corporation for the first time. Initially, the government limited total TV advertising to a maximum of 12 minutes per day.
Law enforcement officers in Selma, Alabama, arrested 768 people (nearly all of them African-Americans, including Martin Luther King Jr.) who were marching to protest the impediments to voter registration within Selma and Dallas County. Sheriff Jim Clark charged the group with "parading without permit". Sheriff Clark would arrest another 150 marchers, mostly high school students, later in the week. 
John P. McConnell replaced Curtis LeMay as Chief of Staff of the United States Air Force.
Manned Spacecraft Center (MSC) received on schedule the first qualification configuration extravehicular life-support system (ELSS) chest pack. Tests of this unit and the ELSS umbilical assembly were being conducted at MSC. Meanwhile, AiResearch was preparing for systems qualification tests. Zero-gravity flight tests of the ELSS had shown that egress and ingress while wearing a chest pack could readily be done by properly trained astronauts.
Gemini Agena target vehicle (GATV) 5001 was removed from the test stand at Santa Cruz Test Base and returned to Sunnyvale, California. After a brief stopover in systems test complex C-10, the vehicle was transferred to the anechoic chamber for electromagnetic interference and radio-frequency-interference tests. Test preparations began February 23. At this point, GATV 5001 was 37 calendar days behind schedule, 20 days of which were caused by the time-accumulator anomaly that had developed during hot-firing tests. A temporary fix for the time-accumulator jumps was installed, while Lockheed continued its efforts to diagnose the problem and find a permanent remedy.
Born:
Sherilyn Fenn, American film and TV actress, in Detroit
Brandon Lee, Chinese-American actor, son of Bruce Lee and Linda Lee Cadwell, in Oakland, California (died in on-set accident, 1993)
Princess Stéphanie of Monaco, daughter of Prince Rainier III and Princess Grace, in Monte Carlo

February 2, 1965 (Tuesday)
A vote intended to remove British Prime Minister Harold Wilson, made as a no confidence motion by the United Kingdom's Conservative Party, failed in the House of Commons by 17 votes.  Voting along party lines, the parties disapproved the censure motion, a resolution describing Wilson's decisions in his first 100 days as premier as "hasty and ill-considered", with 289 Conservative members voting in favor, and 306 Labour members against.  The nine MPs from the Liberal Party abstained.
Wilson announced to the House of Commons that the Cabinet had voted to cancel three expensive defense projects.  Two were for aircraft capable of vertical takeoffs and landings (VTOL): the Armstrong Whitworth AW.681 was a large military transport plane, and the Hawker Siddeley P.1154 was a supersonic fighter aircraft.  The third, the British Aircraft Corporation TSR-2 was a high-speed attack and reconnaissance jet.  Wilson said that the cost of the research and development for the TSR-2 alone had already reached 750,000,000 British pounds, more than eight times the original forecast, and that each of the 150 planned TSR-2s would cost four million pounds apiece. 
Missing salesman Lawrence Joseph Bader was spotted at the National Sporting Goods Show in Chicago, United States, by a former classmate almost 8 years after he had vanished.  Bader had been missing since May 15, 1957, and had been declared legally dead in 1960, enabling his wife to collect $40,000 of life insurance.  Shortly after his disappearance in 1957, he had become known in Omaha, Nebraska, as John Francis "Fritz" Johnson, had married again, and had become a sportscaster at the KETV television station.  After multiple confirmations of his identity, Johnson still denied having any memory of being Lawrence Bader, and offered to have his fingerprints compared to Bader's army record; the prints were a match and specialists concluded that he had suffered from amnesia for eight years.  He died of cancer, in Omaha, on September 16, 1966.
Police in Selma, Alabama, jailed an additional 520 African-American protesters, bringing the total number of people to 1,288.
The U.S. National Science Foundation announced that a team of scientists, led by Keith A.J. Wise of the Bishop Museum of Hawaii, had discovered living animals "in a miniature garden high above a desolate Antarctic icecap 309 miles from the South Pole".  The tiny mites, only one quarter of a millimeter (or 1/100th of an inch) in length, were discovered in soil in the Queen Maud Mountains.
Born: Catherine Elizabeth "Cady" Huffman, Tony Award-winning American stage actress, in Santa Barbara, California
Died: G. N. Watson, 79, English mathematician best known for Watson's lemma

February 3, 1965 (Wednesday)
An 8.7 magnitude earthquake struck Alaska's Rat Islands at 7:01 p.m. local time (0501 UTC on 4 February 1965) in the western Aleutian Islands of the U.S., and would prove to be the last of the major Pacific quakes of the 20th century.
Abdul Kahar Muzakkar, the 44-year-old leader of the Darul Islam rebellion against the Indonesian government in South Sulawesi, was tracked down and killed by an Indonesian Army patrol, bringing an end to the rebellion.
U.S. President Lyndon B. Johnson received the "America's Democratic Legacy" award from the Anti-Defamation League of B'nai B'rith.
Renny Ottolina launched his new show, Renny Presenta..., on Venezuelan television.
Born: Maura Tierney, American film and TV actress; in Boston

February 4, 1965 (Thursday)
Trofim Lysenko, whose opinions on genetics and biology held Soviet research isolated from the rest of the world scientific community, was dismissed from his position as Director of the Institute of Genetics at the Soviet Academy of Sciences. Lysenko, who had been made Director in 1940 by Joseph Stalin, was removed after Academy Director Mstislav Keldysh condemned his policies.
Queen Elizabeth II of the United Kingdom was given the "Freedom of the City" honor (referred to in the United States as the "key to the city") in a ceremony at Addis Ababa City Hall during her visit to Ethiopia.
At a press conference in Paris, French President Charles de Gaulle called for an end to the Bretton Woods system that had been in force since 1958, and a worldwide return to the gold standard. Over the next two years, de Gaulle would lobby for transfer payments between nations to be made in gold and would ultimately abandon the idea in favor of closer cooperation with France's European partners.
The Confederation of British Industry was founded.
Because of interest expressed by George M. Low, Deputy Director of Manned Spacecraft Center, in Gemini spacecraft weight-control vigilance at the previous Gemini Management Panel meeting, Gemini Program Manager Charles W. Mathews reported that weight had increased only  in the past month, and a "leveling-off trend" had been discernible over the last two months. Low, however, was still concerned about the dangers of unforeseen growth as the program progressed from flight to flight. Walter F. Burke of McDonnell suggested that redundant systems be eliminated once the primary systems had been proved. Both Air Force Space Systems Division and the Gemini Program Office were charged by Low to pay close attention to weight factor.
Died: J. B. Danquah, 69, Ghana independence leader who had run for president against Kwame Nkrumah; of a heart attack while in solitary confinement at Nsawam Medium Prison

February 5, 1965 (Friday)
Prime Minister Chou En-lai of the People's Republic of China hosted Prime Minister Alexei Kosygin of the Soviet Union at a banquet, in the first visit by a Soviet leader to China since a rift had developed between the two Communist nations. Kosygin then departed Beijing the next day for a visit to North Vietnam.
Gemini spacecraft No. 3 was moved to complex 19 and hoisted into position atop Gemini launch vehicle 3. Test operations began February 9 with premate systems tests, which lasted until February 13. These were followed by a premate Simulated Flight Test, February 14–16. Data from this testing were compared with data from Spacecraft Systems Tests at McDonnell and predelivery acceptance tests at vendors' plants. The purpose of these tests was to integrate the spacecraft with the launch complex and take a last detailed look at the functioning of all spacecraft systems (especially those in the adapter) before the spacecraft was mechanically mated to the launch vehicle.
Modifications to Gemini launch vehicle 5 were completed and stage I was erected in the vertical test facility at Martin-Baltimore. Stage II was erected February 8. Power was applied to the vehicle for the first time on February 15, and Subsystems Functional Verification Tests were completed March 8. Another modification period followed.
The Walt Disney studio bought the Disneyland theme park along with the WED Enterprises name.
Born: Gheorghe Hagi, Romanian soccer football midfielder, Romanian national team starter 1983–2000 and participant in three World Cups; in Săcele
Died: Irving Bacon, 71, American character actor in 509 films and 33 television series over a 50-year period

February 6, 1965 (Saturday)
All 87 persons aboard LAN Chile Flight 107 were killed when the DC-6B airliner crashed into the Andes Mountains, a few minutes after taking off from Santiago in Chile to Buenos Aires in Argentina.
Soviet Prime Minister Alexei Kosygin arrived in Hanoi for a state visit to North Vietnam.
Partap Singh Kairon, the former Chief Minister of the Indian state of Punjab, was assassinated after meeting with Prime Minister Shastri. Kairon, who had been a leader of the Punjabi independence movement in India, was being driven from Delhi on his way back to his home at Amritsar. He was passing through the village of Resni when four men with rifles attacked his car, killing him, his chauffeur, his private secretary and a former state cabinet aide.
Congolese Prime Minister Moise Tshombe and Belgian Foreign Minister Paul-Henri Spaak signed an agreement in Brussels, with Belgium paying off $250 million worth of interest on Congo's pre-independence debts of nearly one billion dollars. In return, Congo would compensate the Belgian owners of mines that had been nationalized by the government. "From today, the Congo is independent", Tshombe told reporters, adding "We will achieve our program of economic reconstruction."
Five days after his 50th birthday, Sir Stanley Matthews became the oldest person ever to play a game in England's highest-level soccer Football League, when he assisted Stoke City in its 5–1 win at home over Fulham. Matthews, who had been knighted earlier as part of the New Year Honours, had made his debut for Stoke City almost 33 years earlier, in March, 1932, and retired from competition after the game.

February 7, 1965 (Sunday)
A mortar and small arms attack by the Viet Cong, on the Camp Holloway U.S. station adjacent to the airport at Pleiku, killed eight American advisers and wounded 108 others. The attackers also destroyed six Huey helicopters and a Caribou transport plane and damaged 15 other aircraft.
President Johnson responded by launching Operation Flaming Dart, sending 49 U.S. Navy bombers to bomb North Vietnamese army barracks in Đồng Hới and other targets around North Vietnam's Gulf of Tonkin. 
McGeorge Bundy, National Security Advisor to U.S. President Lyndon Johnson, delivered a memorandum, "Re: A Policy of Sustained Reprisal", that followed up on his January 27 recommendation that the United States begin the bombing of North Vietnam.  In the second statement, Bundy told the President, "We believe that the best available way of increasing our chance of success in Vietnam is the development and execution of a policy of sustained reprisal against North Vietnam... Once a program of reprisals is clearly underway, it should not be necessary to connect each specific act against North Vietnam to a particular outrage in the South..."  Although Bundy conceded the odds of success "may be somewhere between 25% and 75%", he added, "What we can say is that even if it fails, the policy will be worth it. At a minimum it will damp down the charge that we did not do all that we could have done, and this charge will be important in many countries, including our own."  Author Charles Lemert would later comment, "Bundy's sustained reprisal memorandum defined Johnson's fatal policy.  By December 1965, 200,000 troops had replaced the 20,000 or so advisers in Vietnam at the beginning of the year.  And by 1968 Johnson's presidency and his Great Society program would be in ruins..."
The Broadway musical Kelly, with lyrics by Eddie Lawrence and music by Mark Charlap, had its opening night performance at the Broadhurst Theatre and then closed, making history as the most expensive Broadway failure up to that time. The loss to investors in 1965 was $650,000, equivalent to almost $4.9 million fifty years later.  
Lester Maddox closed his popular Pickrick Restaurant in Atlanta, one day after he had begrudgingly announced that he would relent to a court order and serve African-American customers, rather than to face a daily $200 fine for contempt of court.  At noon, when a young black man named Jack Googer arrived to be the first customer, Maddox announced that he was closing the business. "I cannot betray my vow to my God" (to not serve Negro customers), he told reporters. "Dollars are unimportant to me."  Maddox then placed a sign on the door, announcing that the Pickrick was "out of business, resulting from an act passed by the U.S. Congress, signed by President Johnson and inspired and supported by deadly and bloody Communism."
Born: Chris Rock, African-American comedian; in Andrews, South Carolina
Died: Nance O'Neil, 90, American stage and silent film actress nicknamed "the American Bernhardt"

February 8, 1965 (Monday)
Twenty-four Republic of Vietnam Air Force bombers, personally led by General Nguyễn Cao Kỳ, crossed from South Vietnam and struck targets in and around the Quảng Bình Province of North Vietnam, and the crews returned to a heroes' welcome. The act became symbolic of South Vietnam's determination to fight for its own defense against Communism, and contributed to President Johnson's decision at a meeting of his National Security Council later that day. Thereafter, sustained bombing of North Vietnam would become a "continuing action" rather than one of occasional reprisals. Support in the United States for an increased fight in Vietnam was evident from newspapers reporting on Operation Flaming Dart. The Washington Post said in an editorial the next day, "withdrawal from South Vietnam would not gain peace, but only lead to another war", and added, "The United States Government has taken the only course available to it, if it does not wish to surrender."
All 84 people on board Eastern Air Lines Flight 663 were killed when the plane crashed into the Atlantic Ocean, moments after taking off from New York's John F. Kennedy International Airport. The Eastern Airlines flight was forced to make an unusually steep turn in order to avoid a collision with an incoming airliner, Pan Am Flight 212.
On the same day as the Eastern crash, a Scandinavian Airlines DC-7 burst into flames as it was attempting to take off from Tenerife in the Canary Islands on a flight to Copenhagen, but all 91 people on board were evacuated (84 of them uninjured) before the plane was consumed by flames.
The Manned Spacecraft Center announced the selection of L. Gordon Cooper, Jr., as command pilot and Charles Conrad, Jr., as pilot for the seven-day Gemini 5 mission. The backup crew was announced as Neil A. Armstrong and Elliot M. See, Jr.
Queen Elizabeth II of the United Kingdom continued her African state visit, moving on from Ethiopia, where her host was Emperor Haile Selassie, to Sudan, where she was greeted by President al-Mahi.
The city of Empire, Oregon, population 3,917, ceased to exist and became part of Coos Bay, making Coos Bay the largest city on the Oregon coast. Voters in Empire had approved the merger and the surrender of their city charter on December 7, 1964, by a vote of 463 to 387, while Coos Bay residents had approved the merger overwhelmingly on January 8, 1965, by a margin of 1,329 to 181.
Born: Dicky Cheung (stage name for Cheung Wai-kin), Cantopop singer and actor, in Hong Kong
Died: Wayne Estes, 21, American college basketball star for Utah State University, was killed in a freak accident less than two hours after leading a 91–62 win over Denver University and scoring 48 points (including the 2000th point of his career). As he walked back to campus, he brushed against a high voltage wire that had been knocked down by a car, and was electrocuted. At the time of his death, Estes was the second most prolific scorer in major college basketball, averaging 33.7 points a game (less than Rick Barry and ahead of Bill Bradley, and was considered to be a likely first round NBA draft pick.

February 9, 1965 (Tuesday)
As bombing of North Vietnam continued, the People's Republic of China issued a statement that: "We warn U.S. imperialism: You are overreaching yourselves in trying to extend the war with your small forces in Indochina, Southeast Asia, and the Far East. To be frank, we are waiting for you in battle array." On the same day, U.S. National Security Adviser McGeorge Bundy told Senator Mike Mansfield that the Johnson administration "was willing to run the risk of a war with China" if an invasion of North Vietnam was deemed necessary.
The first twenty of 1,819 wives and children of South Vietnam-based American civilian and military personnel departed that nation, by order of President Johnson. The rest, including the dependents of Ambassador Maxwell Taylor and General William Westmoreland, would depart over the next 15 days.
A mob of about 3,000 Asian and Russian students who were protesting against the American bombing of North Vietnam attacked the U.S. Embassy in Moscow. Two reporters, Adam Clymer of The Baltimore Sun and Bernard Ullman of the Agence France-Presse news agency, were injured, and more than 200 windows in the ten-story building were shattered before Moscow police intervened.
President Tito of Yugoslavia was awarded the Grand Star of the Decoration for Services to the Republic of Austria.
Voting began for the next president of the 1.2 million member United Steelworkers of America (USWA) labor union, at 3,300 union offices, plants and other locations. In a close election, I. W. Abel defeated incumbent President David J. McDonald by only 6,228 votes.
Died: Khan Bahadur Ahsanullah, 91, Bengali educator who assisted in the formation of the University of Dhaka; the Ahsanullah University of Science and Technology, founded in 1995 by the Dhaka Ahsania Mission that he had established, would be named in his honor.

February 10, 1965 (Wednesday)
The first "one-shot" vaccine against the measles was made available to American physicians, the day after its approval by the U.S. Food and Drug Administration.  Although vaccinations against the measles had first been introduced in the U.S. in 1963, they had required children to receive several injections in order for immunity against the virus to be obtained.  The new measles shot, using a greatly-weakened strain of the measles virus, was 99% effective in providing a lifelong immunity to the illness. 
Three days after their attack on the U.S. Army barracks at Pleiku, the Viet Cong staged an attack on another barracks at Qui Nhơn, killing 23 American soldiers, two VC and seven civilians leading to even heavier U.S. air strikes against North Vietnam  McGeorge Bundy would tell a reporter later, "Pleikus are like streetcars", in that it could be expected that after each incident, the U.S. could expect that another one would arrive when the time was right.
Died: Admiral Arthur C. Davis, 71, naval aviation pioneer who perfected dive bombing techniques.

February 11, 1965 (Thursday)
On his way back to Moscow from Hanoi, Soviet Prime Minister Alexei Kosygin stopped in Beijing for the second time in less than a month, and met with China's Communist Party General Secretary, Mao Zedong, with a suggestion that the two nations help the United States to "find a way out of Vietnam" that would end the continuing war there; Mao's response was a warning that the Soviets should not use Vietnam as a bargaining issue in negotiations with the U.S., and refused to agree. 
Operation Flaming Dart II began as 99 U.S. Navy carrier aircraft attacked enemy logistics and communications at Chanh Hoa barracks in southern North Vietnam near the DMZ.
India's Prime Minister Lal Bahadur Shastri announced that his government was abandoning plans, announced on January 26, to have Hindi replace English as the nation's official language. The decision followed more than two weeks of rioting in southern India and the deaths of over 100 people in clashes with police. "For an indefinite period", Shastri said in a nationwide address, "I would have English an associate language... I do not wish the people of the non-Hindi areas to feel that certain doors of advancement are closed to them." The "indefinite period" never expired, and India would later have 23 official languages, with English as the lingua franca.
Atlas standard launch vehicle 5301 completed testing on complex 14 with a flight-readiness demonstration. It was then deerected and transferred to Hangar J, where its sustainer engine was to be replaced. Replacement was finished April 19, and the new level sensor and vernier engine was installed on April 21. The vehicle was returned to complex 14 and erected again on June 18.

February 12, 1965 (Friday)
The refueling reactor on the Soviet nuclear submarine K-11 became overheated and exploded, causing radiation contamination but no deaths.
Twenty-nine activists set out on the Aboriginal Freedom Ride in Australia.
Yaroslav Golovanov, the science editor for the Soviet youth newspaper Komsomolskaya Pravda, was approved for cosmonaut training for the Soviet space program, along with two other journalists with engineering backgrounds, Mikhail Rebrov of the Defense Ministry newspaper Krasnaya Zvezda and Yuri Letunov of Gosteleradio, the government-owned radio network. After the death a year later of their mentor, Soviet space program chief Sergei Korolev, the three were dropped from the program. It would not be until 25 years later, in 1990, that a member of the press, Toyohiro Akiyama of the Tokyo Broadcasting System, would become the first journalist to be launched into outer space.
OCAM (Organization Commune Africaine et Malgache), the African and Malagasy Common Organization, was formed at Nouakchott, Mauritania, as a successor to the Afro-Malagasy Union for Economic Cooperation (Union Africaine et Malgache de Coopération Économique; UAMCE), formerly the African and Malagasy Union (Union Africaine et Malgache; UAM)). The 13 initial members were all former French colonies (Cameroon, the Central African Republic, Congo-Brazzaville, Dahomey, Gabon, the Ivory Coast, Madagascar, Mauritania, Niger, Senegal, Togo and Upper Volta).
Plans for the U.S. Head Start program, for early education for underprivileged children, were given massive publicity by Lady Bird Johnson, the First Lady, when she hosted prominent women as guests for a tea party at the White House. Women from business and entertainment were invited, along with the wives of high-ranking federal government officials, the wives of some state governors, and a few men, "primarily church leaders". Mrs. Johnson addressed the need for early education for all preschoolers, and the reporting of her party on the "society pages" of newspapers brought a favorable response for Head Start and for the War on Poverty.
Director of Flight Operations Christopher C. Kraft, Jr., told the Manned Spacecraft Center senior staff that the Gemini-Titan (GT) 3 mission might be flown between March 22 and 25, although it was officially scheduled for the second quarter of 1965. In addition, the Houston control center was being considered for use in the GT-4 mission.
Died: John Hays Hammond Jr., 76, American electrical engineer and inventor of radio control for remote guidance of missiles, unmanned combat vehicles, drones and other "RC" devices.

February 13, 1965 (Saturday)

By a margin of 225 to 197, İsmet İnönü, the longtime leader of Turkey as president and later as Prime Minister, lost a vote of no-confidence in the Turkish National Assembly and was forced to resign.  A new government would be formed by Suat Hayri Ürgüplü on February 20. 
U.S. President Lyndon B. Johnson agreed with advisers that a campaign of sustained reprisal in air strikes against North Vietnam would be necessary in order to end the war there. The attacks, described officially as "a program of measured and limited air action jointly" with South Vietnam, would be ordered by the President on February 24 as Operation Rolling Thunder, would begin on March 2 the first of many over the rest of the decade.
Wasfi al-Tal was chosen as the new Prime Minister of Jordan by King Hussein.  Hussein dismissed Bahjat Talhouni from the job after concluding that Talhuni had conceded too much in summits with Egypt's President Nasser, and chose al-Tal, who was "anti-Egyptian and "anti-PLO".
The villages of Paidha and Goli, Uganda, located on the African nation's border with the Democratic Republic of the Congo, were bombed by Congolese military aircraft, prompting Ugandan Prime Minister Milton Obote to activate all former Ugandan Army members and to call on the citizens to defend the country.  In response to the Ugandan charges, the Congo government in Leopoldville said that Ugandan troops had assisted Congolese rebels in attacking the Congolese town of Mahagi on February 5.  By the end of the year, the Ugandan Army would more than double in size, to 4,500 men.
Nicholas Katzenbach was sworn in as U.S. Attorney General.
American members of the International Longshoremen's Association returned to work after reaching a settlement in their 33-day long strike, which had started on January 11.
Died: 
General Humberto Delgado, 58, a former Portuguese Air Force commander who had been exiled and was an opponent of the regime of Portugal's dictator, António de Oliveira Salazar, was kidnapped and murdered by PIDE secret police forces near the border town of Olivenza.  Murdered also was Delgado's Brazilian secretary, Arajaryr Moreira de Campo.
Gloria Morgan Vanderbilt, 60,  Swiss-born American socialite, mother of Gloria Vanderbilt

February 14, 1965 (Sunday)
The home of African-American civil rights advocate Malcolm X (who used the surname Shabazz), in the Elmhurst neighborhood of Queens, New York City, was firebombed by Molotov cocktails while he, his wife and their four children were inside. The family escaped unharmed, but the house was seriously damaged; Malcolm X would be assassinated a week later.
A qualifying match in the 1965 African Cup of Nations football tournament between Kenya and Ethiopia was awarded to Ethiopia as a walkover, after the Confederation of African Football (CAF) upheld a protest by Ethiopia because Kenya had fielded two players (Moses Wabwayi and Stephen Baraza) who were ineligible because they had represented Uganda previously. Ethiopia qualified and the two players were suspended for one year after Uganda stated that they were still registered with the Uganda F.A.

February 15, 1965 (Monday)
In Sofia, an angry mob of 300 students broke through a cordon of 100 police who were protecting the American legation to Bulgaria and wrecked the first floor of the building.
Three prominent public officials of the Republic of the Congo— Joseph Pouabou (Chief Justice of the Supreme Court of the Congo), Lazare Matsocota (Attorney General and chief prosecutor), and Massouémé Anselme (Director of the Congolese Information Agency)— were kidnapped from Brazzaville and murdered.
TWW, the independent British television network covering south Wales and west England, inaugurated its new service, reviving the Teledu Cymru broadcasting that had halted a year earlier. Local programming, including Welsh music and some Welsh-language shows, was directed on four channels at St Hilary, near Cardiff (Channel 7), Preseli (Channel 8), Arfon (Channel 10) and Moel-y-Parc (near Wrexham) (Channel 11).
The Beatles recorded "Ticket to Ride" at the EMI Studios in London.
A new red and white maple leaf design was inaugurated as the flag of Canada, replacing the Union Flag and the Canadian Red Ensign. At noon, the new banner was raised first on the Peace Tower of the Parliament Building in Ottawa.
Methamphetamine inhalers, formerly available in the United States as an over-the-counter medicine, were barred from sale by the U.S. Food and Drug Administration (FDA) except by doctor prescription. In announcing the new rules, FDA Commissioner George P. Larrick said that he had received 153 reports of meth abuse in 1964, compared with 54 in 1963 and only five a year in 1960, 1961 and 1962.
Cyrus Vance, the Deputy U.S. Secretary of Defense, ordered the Departments of the Army and the Air Force to amend their regulations regarding individual state National Guard units, so as to prevent any racial discrimination as a requirement of association with the U.S. military. Such regulations were ordered to be implemented "to ensure that the policy of equal opportunity and treatment is clearly stated"; the new requirements would be quickly accepted by the states, and by the end of 1965, there would not be a single segregated national guard unit in any of the fifty states.
Goddard Space Flight Center selected Bendix Field Engineering Corporation, Owings Mills, Maryland, for a contract to operate, maintain, and support the stations of the Manned Space Flight Tracking Network. The cost-plus-award-fee contract was valued at approximately $36 million over two years.
United Artists' new epic film The Greatest Story Ever Told, starring Max von Sydow as Jesus Christ, premièred at the Warner Cinerama Theatre in New York City. Despite an all-star cast including Charlton Heston, John Wayne, Claude Rains, Shelley Winters, Sidney Poitier and José Ferrer, it did poorly at the box office.
Died: Nat King Cole, 45, American singer and jazz pianist, from lung cancer

February 16, 1965 (Tuesday)
Flying along the coast of central South Vietnam, 1st Lt. James S. Bowers, a United States Army officer flying a MEDEVAC helicopter, spotted and sank an enemy naval trawler camouflaged with trees and bushes. News of the event was summarized in a U.S. State Department White Paper, released to the press at month's end, titled Aggression from the North: The Record of North Viet-Nam's Campaign to Conquer South Viet-Nam; in the opinion of one war historian, "The position paper was clearly designed to justify a US military response" which would come in the form of increased bombing of North Vietnam.
Phan Huy Quát was sworn in as the new civilian Prime Minister of South Vietnam, although effective control of the nation remained with two generals, Nguyễn Văn Thiệu and Nguyễn Cao Kỳ.
Radio Moscow, the official English-language broadcasting station of the Soviet Union, warned that American bombing raids on North Vietnam could lead to a world war. "The flames of war starting in one place could easily spread to neighboring countries and, in the final count, embrace the whole world", the broadcast noted, and admonished that "responsibility for the dire consequences of such a policy rests with America."
The Rolling Stones concluded their Far East Tour with a concert at Badminton Hall, Singapore.
Aboriginal activists in Australia conducted a sit-in to challenge de facto segregation of a Sydney hotel.
Frank McNamee, the Chief Justice of the Supreme Court of Nevada, was found near death in his apartment near Lake Tahoe, after apparently being severely beaten by a robber. Phillippe Denning would be arrested at a St. Louis bus station the next day with stolen items, and would later be convicted of attempted murder. McNamee would never recover from his head injuries, and would pass away three years later.
The first Pegasus satellite was launched by the United States to determine the extent of potential damage in orbit by micrometeoroids. Once in orbit, Pegasus unfolded wings "to a span greater than a four-engine airliner" in order to provide "a huge target for the tiny, almost invisible particles it seeks to catch". All strikes were recorded on a data collector. As the third largest satellite up to that time, Pegasus was visible at night as a pinpoint of light as it passed over an area within its orbit.
U.S. Navy divers Fred Jackson and John Youmans were killed in a decompression chamber fire at the Experimental Diving Unit in Washington, D.C., shortly after additional oxygen was added to the chamber's atmospheric mix.

February 17, 1965 (Wednesday)
The U.S. Department of Defense reported a record number of American casualties for the week of February 14 to February 20. The 37 Americans killed were more than had died in the first two years of American involvement in Vietnam; 32 had died in 1961 and 1962. Twenty-three of the men killed had died in the bombing of the Qui Nhơn barracks.
The Syrian government expelled U.S. diplomat Walter Snowdon, saying he had offered bribes for information to military officers.
A bomb blast in Vatican City heavily damaged the building occupied by the Swiss Guard, bodyguards for the Pope. Actor Claudio Volonté, the brother of Gian Maria Volonte, producer of the controversial play The Deputy, was arrested the next day and charged with being one of the two younger men who had planted the bomb.
Police clashed with 400 black students outside the Brooklyn Board of Education, as a boycott of New York City schools continued to grow.
U.S. Senator Frank Church of Idaho became the first member of Congress to begin an open debate about American involvement in Vietnam, delivering a speech titled "We Are in Too Deep in Asia and Africa", based on an article that he had written for The New York Times Magazine. Of him, it would be written later, "no senator had a longer career of opposition to the Vietnam War or a greater impact on American foreign policy than Frank Church."
The lunar probe Ranger 8 was launched from Cape Kennedy. The photographs it transmitted would help select landing sites for future Apollo missions.
Gemini launch vehicle 3 and spacecraft No. 3 were mechanically mated on complex 19. The Electrical Interface Integrated Validation Test was completed February 19, the Joint Guidance and Control Test on February 22. Gemini-Titan 3 combined systems testing included the Joint Combined Systems Test on February 24 and the Flight Configuration Mode Test on March 3.
A series of live jumps from high altitude to qualify the Gemini personnel parachute began. The ballute failed to deploy because of a malfunction of the aneroid device responsible for initiating ballute deployment. The identical malfunction had occurred during the high-altitude ejection test on February 12. These two failures prompted a design review of the ballute deployment mechanism. The aneroid was modified, and the qualification test program for the personnel parachute was realigned. In place of the remaining 23 low-altitude live jump tests, 10 high-altitude dummy drops using the complete personnel parachute system (including the ballute), followed by five high-altitude live jumps, would complete the program. All sequences functioned normally in all tests but one: in that one, the ballute failed to leave its deployment bag (corrected by eliminating the bag closure pin from the design) and the backboard and egress kit failed to separate (resolved by instituting a special inspection procedure). Again all test were successful but one, in which the ballute failed to deploy. This series completed qualification of the personnel parachute and also of the overall Gemini escape system.
Academy Award-winning actress Patricia Neal suffered two near-fatal strokes at the age of 39, shortly after coming home for the day from filming of the movie 7 Women, and was rushed into emergency brain surgery. After being in a coma for weeks, she survived, and, on August 4, would give birth to the daughter she had been carrying, Lucy Dahl. After years of recovery, Neal would return to acting.
Born: Michael Bay, American film director, in Los Angeles 
Died: 
Tadeusz Lehr-Spławiński, 73, Polish scholar and academician 
Joan Merriam Smith, 28, American aviator who had made a solo flight around the world in 1964 along the 1937 flight plan of Amelia Earhart, but who finished second to Jerrie Mock, who was attempting the feat at the same time. Mrs. Smith (and a magazine writer, Trixie Anne Schubert), were killed when her Cessna 100 plane crashed and exploded on Blue Ridge in California's San Gabriel Mountains.

February 18, 1965 (Thursday)

The Gambia, at  the smallest nation in Africa, became independent from the United Kingdom, with the lowering of the British Flag at midnight and the raising of the new Gambian flag at McCarthy Square in Bathurst (now Banjul). Sir Dawda Jawara continued as Prime Minister, and Sir John W. Paul, a British colonial administrator who had served as the Governor since 1962, became the first Governor-General of The Gambia. It would become a presidential republic on April 24, 1970, with Jawara as the first president. On July 22, 1994, after 29 years as a parliamentary democracy, the Gambia would be ruled by a military government.
Hastings Banda, the Prime Minister of Malawi and its Minister of Defence and Public Security, announced new regulations to increase his dictatorial power over the African nation. He designated a new group, the Malawi Young Pioneers, to be his "eyes and ears" in every village in Malawi, gave the police and his public security forces the power to detain suspects indefinitely, and authorized his agents to shoot suspected dissidents if they resisted arrest.
Archaeologist Margherita Guarducci announced in Rome that she had located and identified the remains of Saint Peter, the chief apostle of Jesus Christ. "Today, everything is clear", Guarducci told the Vatican press service. "The original tomb was empty because at the time of the Emperor Constantine, Peter's bones had been transferred to a secret place. This hiding place was inside a wall with inscriptions, which was then closed in the monument put up by Constantine in honor of the apostle." Shimon Bar-Yona, later designated as Simon Peter and honored as the first Pope of the Roman Catholic Church, was believed to have been crucified not long after the Great Fire of Rome in AD 64, and Guarducci concluded that the skeletal remains were those of an individual between the ages of 60 and 70.
President Johnson hosted prominent American bankers and investment leaders (including David Rockefeller, Sidney Weinberg and Thomas S. Gates Jr.) at a White House meeting and asked them to voluntarily limit foreign lending in order to reduce the American balance of payments deficit. "The bankers acted against their own profit motives and for the economic strength of the United States", an author would later note, "possibly for the last time in American history..."
Testifying before the House Committee on Science and Astronautics during hearings on NASA's Fiscal Year 1966 budget, Associate Administrator for Manned Space Flight George E. Mueller briefly outlined the space agency's immediate post-Apollo objectives: "Apollo capabilities now under development," he said, "will enable us to produce space hardware and fly it for future missions at a small fraction of the original development cost. This is the basic concept in the Apollo Extension System (AES) now under consideration." Mueller stated that the Apollo Extension System had "the potential to provide the capability to perform a number of useful missions utilizing Apollo hardware developments in an earlier time frame than might otherwise be expected. This program would follow the basic Apollo manned lunar landing program and would represent an intermediate step between this important national goal and future manned space flight programs."
At 9:57 in the morning, an avalanche of snow buried the Leduc Camp in British Columbia, killing 27 copper miners working for the Newmont Mining Corporation workers and destroying several buildings. Another 42 of the 68 people buried were rescued on the same day, while a carpenter, Einar Myllyla, was saved three days later from the ruins of a collapsed building. "To their everlasting credit", author Jay Robert Nash would write later, "rescuers refused to abandon their search until every man in the camp had been accounted for."
Sinoite, which does not occur naturally on Earth, but which has been found in meteorites, was first identified as a distinct new mineral. A team of scientists working at Moffett Field in California said that the mineral, a silicon oxynitride, had been isolated from a meteorite that had fallen in Pakistan in 1926. The name itself was coined from the chemical designation (Si2N2O) and meteorite.
In Marion, Alabama, Jimmie Lee Jackson, an unarmed African-American protester, was shot and fatally wounded by an Alabama Highway Patrol trooper, James Bonard Fowler.
Born: 
Dr. Dre (stage name for Andre Young), American rapper, in Compton, California
Masaki Saito, former Japanese baseball pitcher (Tokyo Yomiuri Giants) in Kawaguchi, Saitama Prefecture

February 19, 1965 (Friday)
President Johnson decided, after a meeting with his National Security Council, to make continuous and regular bombing strikes against North Vietnam. Robert S. McNamara, at the time the Secretary of Defense, would note later that Johnson refused to announce his decision publicly and that "This judgment would eventually cost him dearly." 
A coup was attempted in South Vietnam at 1:00 p.m. local time.  Units of the Army of the Republic of Vietnam (ARVN) commanded by General Lâm Văn Phát and Colonel Phạm Ngọc Thảo launched the coup against the nation's head of state, General Nguyễn Khánh.  Fifty tanks and a combination of infantry battalions, led by Colonel Dương Hiếu Nghĩa, seized control of the post office and radio station in Saigon, cutting off communication lines. The home of General Khanh, and Gia Long Palace, the residence of head of state Suu, were surrounded.  The coup collapsed when the U.S., in collaboration with Generals Nguyễn Chánh Thi and Cao Văn Viên, assembled units hostile to both Khanh and the current coup into a Capital Liberation Force.  Saigon was recaptured "without a shot" the next day by loyal troops, and Khanh was restored to power, but would remain in office only two more days. "
The massive Dutch cargo ship MV Sophocles caught fire and exploded when its cargo of fertilizer ignited, then sank in the Atlantic Ocean, drowning three of her crew of 44. Another Dutch ship, MV Ulysees, rescued the 41 survivors.
Lufthansa signed up as the first customer for the forthcoming Boeing 737
The U.S. Senate unanimously (72-0) approved the proposed Twenty-Fifth Amendment to the U.S. Constitution, providing for appointment and confirmation to fill any vacancy in the office of Vice President of the United States, as well as allowing the Vice President to serve as Acting President if the incumbent was "unable to discharge the powers and duties of his office". The U.S. House of Representatives would approve the amendment, with changes, on April 13 by a vote of 368 to 29.
Died: Forrest Taylor, 81, American character actor in film and television

February 20, 1965 (Saturday)
Ranger 8 photographed potential landing sites on the Moon for the Apollo program crewed missions before crashing into the surface. The probe "took a shallow trajectory that crossed the central highlands en route to the Sea of Tranquility, east of lunar meridian", the area favored by the constraints of Apollo's projected west to east orbit. As it steadily dropped in altitude, its cameras were turned on during the last 23 minutes of flight, and the probe transmitted 7,137 high resolution photos, gradually descending until it impacted, at 4:57 a.m.
In Australia, Freedom Ride participants, including Charles Perkins, were ejected from the municipal swimming baths at Moree, New South Wales, after protesting against their segregationist policy of not admitting Aborigines.
President Julius Nyerere concluded a visit to the People's Republic of China with the signing of the Chinese-Tanzanian Treaty of Friendship.
Suat Hayri Ürgüplü was named as the new Prime Minister of Turkey, to form an interim government until new elections for the National Assembly could be conducted on October 10.
At Luluabourg (later renamed Kananga), the Congolese National Convention was formed by 49 tribal organizations, in association with the CONAKAT political party led by Moïse Tshombe, in order to win the 1965 legislative elections.
Over 5,000 students from the Central University of Madrid marched in a silent protest after a planned lecture on cultural repression was prohibited by the Rector. Despite the peaceful nature of the defense, police forcibly dispersed the marchers and seriously injured some of them. The harsh response would lead to even more protests, including a boycott of classes by 17,000 students at the University of Barcelona.
The United Nations and Belgium entered into a global settlement of all claims brought by Belgian citizens for damages arising out of UN operations during the Congo Crisis, with 15 million American dollars paid by the international organization.

February 21, 1965 (Sunday)

Malcolm X was assassinated at Manhattan's Audubon Ballroom, located in Washington Heights at 564 West 166th Street. Shortly before 3:10 pm, as he was preparing to deliver a speech to the Organization of Afro-American Unity, he opened with the greeting As-Salaam Alaikum and the audience acknowledged with Wa-Alaikum-Salaam. At that moment, a man in the crowd shouted "Get your hand out of my pocket!" to a person sitting next to him, an apparent signal for four other spectators to stage a fight. Malcolm said, "Hold it. Let's cool it, brothers", and was shot in the chest by a man who approached the stage with a Luger pistol. As a second man fired from a sawed-off shotgun, a third fired multiple times with a pistol. In all Malcolm X was shot 16 times at close range, and was pronounced dead at the nearby Vanderbilt Clinic at Columbia Presbyterian Hospital at 3:40 p.m. Although the myth persists that the identity of the assassins was "never determined", the third gunman, Thomas Hagan (a.k.a. Talmadge Hayer), was shot and wounded by one of Malcolm's bodyguards, arrested at the ballroom, and confessed to the crime. Two other men, Norman 3X Butler and Thomas 15X Johnson, would be arrested later and convicted of Malcolm's murder, although Hagan testified that they were not involved and may not have even been at the Audubon at all. Born as Malcolm Little in Omaha, Nebraska, in 1925, Malcolm X, described as "arguably the most important contributor to the Black Power movement and a leading figure in American history", died at the age of 39.
The 15 generals comprising South Vietnam's High National Council — Nguyễn Văn Thiệu, Nguyen Van Cao and Nguyễn Cao Kỳ — voted to remove General Nguyễn Khánh from leadership as Prime Minister, and replaced him with a caretaker civilian premier, Trần Văn Hương.
The Soviet Union's ruling Communist Party announced a liberalization of its former policy of discouraging creativity and an end to what it described as former Secretary Nikita Khrushchev's campaign against the "intelligentsia". Speaking through Alexei M. Rumyantsev, the editor-in-chief of Pravda, the party issued a statement that "genuine scientific creativity" was "possible only under conditions of search and experiment, free expression and the clash of opinions... different schools and trends, different styles and genres, competing with each other and united at the same time by their common dialectical-materialistic outlook and unity of the principles of socialist realism." The policy, however, did not extend to free expression of criticism of the Party's political decisions.
East Germany's radio network confirmed that the Soviet Union was publicly acknowledging that Nazi German dictator Adolf Hitler had, as believed, committed suicide on April 30, 1945, by shooting himself in the head, and that Hitler's charred body had been identified beyond any doubt after its recovery from the burial site within the garden of the Chancellery in Berlin.
NASA officials announced that Vanguard 1, the American satellite launched on March 17, 1958, had finally stopped transmitting after nearly seven years, but that it would continue to orbit the Earth. No other satellite had continued to function for that period of time, and by transmitting data, it had "paid rich scientific dividends" during its operation, including "the startling fact that the earth is not round, but pear-shaped".
During the week, the Gemini-Titan 3 prime crew participated in egress training from static article No. 5 in the Gulf of Mexico. After half an hour of postlanding cockpit checks with the hatches closed, Astronauts Virgil I. Grissom and John W. Young practiced the emergency egress procedures developed by the flight crew training staff for Project Gemini. Both pilots then egressed through the left (command pilot's) hatch, after first heaving their survival kits into the water. Each astronaut then practiced boarding a Gemini one-person life raft. Swimmers were standing by in a larger raft.

February 22, 1965 (Monday)
The Soviet Union launched the unmanned Kosmos 57 space capsule in preparation of the Voskhod 2 manned mission.  In its first orbit, the capsule successfully tested its airlock, opening its outer hatch, then closing and pressurizing the interior.  However, when space program director Nikolai Kamanin left the control room, "everything went terribly wrong"; the Tyuratam-based trackers and the ground stations lost contact with the Kosmos spacecraft as it entered its third orbit.  They soon realized that the ship's automatic self-destruct system had somehow triggered and destroyed the spacecraft, which "was tracked in 168 detectable pieces, which re-entered Earth's atmosphere between 31 March and 6 April 1965."
Prince Philip, Duke of Edinburgh, opened the Royal Australian Mint in Canberra.  The Prince, husband of Queen Elizabeth II and a coin collector, "pushed two small green buttons to set in operation the minting of the first decimal coins" at the Australian Mint, and then picked one of the one-cent pieces from a wooden bowl to be placed in a proof set. 
Israeli spy Ze'ev Gur-Aryeh, who posed as a West German businessman using his original German name of Wolfgang Lotz, was arrested in Egypt, along with his wife Waldrud.
U.S. Army General William C. Westmoreland requested the first American combat troops for South Vietnam, asking for 3,500 U.S. Marines from the 9th Marine Expeditionary Brigade, to be sent to guard the Da Nang Air Base. 
The Black Arts Movement was launched by LeRoi Jones (later Amiri Baraka) at a press conference in New York City, the day after the assassination of Malcolm X.  Jones's first project was BARTS, the Black Arts Movement Theater and School.
A new, revised, color production of Rodgers and Hammerstein's Cinderella was broadcast on American television by CBS, with Lesley Ann Warren making her TV debut in the title role. The show would become an annual tradition for eight years, last broadcast in 1974.  Although panned by some critics, the first broadcast drew an estimated 70 million viewers.
Died: Felix Frankfurter, 82, Austrian-born jurist who served as a U.S. Supreme Court Justice from 1939 to 1962

February 23, 1965 (Tuesday)
The government of Syria executed two men convicted of spying for the United States. Farhan Atassi, a naturalized American citizen, was hanged in public at Al Marja Square in Damascus, and Syrian Army Colonel Abdel Moeen Hakimi was shot by a firing squad. Syria had accused both men of working for Walter Snowdon, the second secretary of the U.S. Embassy. Snowdon had been expelled from the country six days earlier.
The first naturally occurring neutrino was detected by a team of physicists, led by Frederick Reines of Case Western Reserve University in a project with the University of the Witwatersrand, using a liquid scintillator at an underground laboratory within the Proprietary Gold Mine near Johannesburg, South Africa. Reines would explain, in accepting the Nobel Prize for Physics thirty years later, that "natural" in this case was "meaning it did not arise from a man-made nuclear reactor", and that the team recorded 167 total events.
The remains of Irish hero Roger Casement, who had been executed by British authorities on August 3, 1916, after participating in the Easter Rising, were reburied in a state funeral at Glasnevin in the Republic of Ireland. Casement's body had been buried in the Pentonville Prison in Great Britain after his hanging.
The Beatles began filming of their movie Help! on the island of New Providence in the Bahamas.
MGM Studios announced that it would begin filming of Stanley Kubrick's science fiction movie, Journey Beyond the Stars, in Cinerama. Three years later, the film, retitled 2001: A Space Odyssey, would be released to theaters under a different wide-screen format, Super Panavision 70.
Two mosques of the Nation of Islam, one in Harlem in New York City, the other in San Francisco, were firebombed, in an apparent retaliation for the assassination two days of earlier of Malcolm X. Six FDNY firemen were injured when the front of the Harlem mosque collapsed.
In a major policy meeting at NASA Headquarters, among George E. Mueller, Associate Administrator for Manned Space Flight (OMSF), Homer E. Newell, Associate Administrator for Space Science and Applications (OSSA), and members of their staffs, a fundamental policy agreement was worked out regarding responsibilities for scientific experiments aboard crewed spaceflights. Basically, OSSA had responsibility for definition of experiments, selection and coordination with experimenters, and, after the flight, analysis and dissemination of scientific data; OMSF was responsible for actual flight hardware, as well as integration into the space vehicles and actual conduct of the mission. Funding responsibilities between the respective offices followed the same pattern.
Born: Michael Dell, American billionaire computer entrepreneur who founded the Dell computer company in 1984; in Houston, Texas
Died: Stan Laurel, 74, American film comedian and half of the duo of Laurel and Hardy

February 24, 1965 (Wednesday)
President Johnson gave the go-ahead orders for Operation Rolling Thunder, the continuing bombing of North Vietnam.  By the end of the 1965, there would be 55,000 missions flown.
Gaspar DiGregorio was identified by U.S. Department of Justice authorities as the new overlord of the New York City's "Five Families" of the American Mafia.  DiGregorio was summoned before a federal grand jury to answer for the October disappearance of Mafia boss Joseph Bonanno.
Pio Gama Pinto, the publisher of the official newspaper of the Kenya African National Union political party and a member of the Kenyan House of Representatives, was shot and killed outside of his home in Nairobi.
Paul Bellesen lost his job as the Great Titan for the National Knights of the Ku Klux Klan for the state of Idaho, one day after he had received his membership card and had shown it to reporters. "I just figured they might do something like that", said Bellesen, who was both an African-American and Roman Catholic.  Bellesen, the operator of a janitorial service in Nampa, Idaho, commented, "It was a great challenge to me to see just how secret the Klan is and if I could get in.  I did."  He noted that he had also applied to the Imperial Wizard of the United Ku Klux Klan, but that "He asked for my photograph."  When Imperial Wizard James R. Venable received the news, his only comment was "His membership is hereby revoked."  Bellesen admitted that he had signed a statement saying that he was a "white, Anglo-Saxon Protestant", but that "Being a Negro and supposedly unable to read anyway, I signed it."
Richard Rodney Bennett's first full-length opera, The Mines of Sulphur, premièred at Sadler's Wells Theatre, London. 

The Canadian province of New Brunswick adopted a new flag.
Spanish police attacked 5,000 University of Madrid students with batons and water hoses. According to one report, "A bugle sounded and hundreds of policemen jumped out of the jeeps with rubber truncheons drawn. The water hoses were turned on the students but they remained seated. When the bugle sounded again, the police charged, beating the students. Men and women students were hustled into the jeeps. Later, many of the students threw stones at the policemen. The police charge was believed to be one of the most brutal against students in Madrid since the Civil war."
The cabinet of West Germany's Chancellor Ludwig Erhard reversed their previous decision of November 11 not to seek an extension of the statute of limitations on Nazi war crimes beyond May 8, 1965, the 20th anniversary of Germany's surrender.  A feature of Germany's constitutions for the past century had been indictments could not be made for any crime more than 20 years after it had been committed.
Born: Alessandro Gassman, Italian actor, son of Vittorio Gassman and Juliette Mayniel, in Rome.

February 25, 1965 (Thursday)
Rudie Liebrechts of the Netherlands broke the world record for the men's 3000 meter speed skating, finishing three kilometers (almost two miles) in less than four and a half minutes (4:26.8) in an event at the Bislett Stadion in Oslo, Norway. The old record had been held for a year by Estonian Ants Antson of the Soviet Union.
In East Berlin, the Volkskammer of the German Democratic Republic (East Germany) passed the "Law on the Unified Socialist Educational System", setting common curricula for various levels, including pre-school education, a polytechnic high school with ten classes, vocational schools, preparatory classes for universities, engineering and technical colleges, liberal arts universities, and continuing education for workers and employees. Under the law, the unifying policy was that all students were "to be educated to love the GDR and to be proud of her social achievements and to be ready to place all their strength at the disposal of society, to strengthen the socialist state, and to defend it."
In Meridian, Mississippi, federal judge William Harold Cox dismissed the felony indictments against 17 of the 18 men accused of the 1964 murders of Chaney, Goodman, and Schwerner, finding insufficient evidence of a conspiracy to deprive the victims of their rights. Misdemeanor charges remained in place for Neshoba County Sheriff Lawrence A. Rainey, Deputy Cecil Price, and a city policeman, Richard Willis, for "participating in a conspiracy under color of law to inflict summary punishment". The case would be appealed to the U.S. Supreme Court and proceed as United States v. Price. Seven defendants would eventually be convicted and would receive federal prison terms ranging from 3 to 10 years.
A federal grand jury in Washington, D.C., brought criminal charges against the Communist Party USA (CPUSA) for failing to register its members as members of a subversive organization, as required by the Subversive Activities Control Act, with fines of up to $10,000 for each of 12 counts. The new indictment included the charge of declining to register "even though it knew there was a volunteer willing to register on behalf of the party." A federal appeals court had dismissed an earlier conviction against the CPUSA because registration would have violated the American constitutional right against self-incrimination.
The National Association of Broadcasters issued restrictions on the format of U.S. television commercials for beer and wine, declaring that such advertising was "acceptable only when presented in the best of good taste and discretion"; conduct barred including "guzzling, smacking of lips, or bobbing of the adam's apple" so as to suggest the "quaffing" of alcohol.
The U.S. Federal Reserve Bank announced that the supply of gold decreased in January by $262 million.
Martin-Denver delivered propellant tanks for Gemini launch vehicle (GLV) 7 to Martin-Baltimore. Tank fabrication had begun in May 1964. Martin-Baltimore recleaned and purged the tanks with nitrogen by April 20, 1965. In the meantime, flight engines for GLV-7 arrived from Aerojet-General on April 17. Tank splicing was completed May 6 and engine installation May 20. All horizontal testing was completed June 14. A modification period followed.
Born: Sylvie Guillem, French ballet dancer, in Paris

February 26, 1965 (Friday)
The European Social Charter, opened for signature on October 18, 1961, became effective on February 26, 1965, after West Germany had become the fifth nation (after Norway, Sweden, the United Kingdom and Ireland) to ratify it. By 1991, the Charter would be effective in 20 nations which had ratified it, and by 2011, there would be 43 parties to a Revised Charter.
François Perin established a new political party in Belgium, the Walloon Workers' Party, on the premise that the Kingdom of Belgium should be a federation between the French-speaking Walloons and the Dutch-speaking Flemings. During the party's brief existence, it would win one seat in Belgium's Chamber of Representatives and then merge with the Walloon Front on June 26. 
Norman 3X Butler was arrested at his home in the Bronx, and charged with being one of the three gunmen who had shot Malcolm X earlier in the week. The arrest was made on the basis of statements by three witnesses who said that Butler had been present at the Audubon Ballroom at the time.
A full-scale rehearsal of the flight crew countdown for Gemini-Titan 3 was conducted at the launch site. Procedures were carried out for moving the flight crew from their quarters in the Manned Spacecraft Center operations building at Merritt Island to the pilot's ready room at complex 16 at Cape Kennedy. Complete flight crew suiting operation in the ready room, the transfer to complex 19, and crew ingress into the spacecraft were practiced. Practice countdown proceeded smoothly and indicated that equipment and procedures were flight ready.
U.S. Navy Lt. (j.g.) Larry Cooper was killed after a surface-to-air missile shot down his A-4 Skyhawk attack plane off the coast of California.
Died: Jimmie Lee Jackson, 26, African-American civil rights protester, eight days after being shot.

February 27, 1965 (Saturday)
The Antonov An-22, nicknamed Antaeus and the largest turboprop airplane ever built, flew for the first time.
Without warning, all 47 West German military personnel in Tanzania withdrew from the African nation and flew home, after West Germany's cabinet decided to terminate military aid to the African nation in retaliation for Tanzania's opening of diplomatic relations with East Germany. "The effect of this forceful display was instantly undermined, however, by a brilliant gesture" by Tanzanian President Julius Nyerere, a historian would write later, who "proclaimed that since the Federal Republic was so insistent on abusing its military aid for political ends, his country would forgo all forms of West German aid... Nyerere's announcement resonated as an example of principled resistance to foreign manipulation." Since the West German decision was made at the same time as the visit of East German leader Walter Ulbricht to Egypt, the unintended consequence would be that Egypt and other nations in Africa and the Middle East would forge closer ties to West Germany's eastern enemy.
In Paris, Paul Gérin-Lajoie, the Minister of Education for the French-speaking Canadian province of Quebec, signed an agreement on educational cooperation with the government of France. After Gérin-Lajoie returned to Canada, Quebec's Premier, Jean Lesage, presented the agreement "as a major advance in Quebec's quest for an international role". Paul Martin, Canada's Minister of External Affairs, would warn France's ambassador that "only Canada had the authority to speak for Canadians on the international stage", and that the Canadian government, not the Quebec provincial government, had the sole power to sign agreements with foreign nations.
The U.S. Department of State issued a white paper to the press, Aggression From the North: The Record of North Viet-Nam's Campaign to Conquer South Viet-Nam, as part of the U.S. government's effort to justify the escalation of the role of the United States in the Vietnam War. As a CIA employee and National Security Council staff member would note later, the paper "proved to be a dismal disappointment... the only hard information we had about North Vietnamese participation and supplies and so forth came from information that was much too highly classified to include, and the only information that was of sufficiently low classification was pretty thin gruel." Among other things, the paper asserted that "In Vietnam a Communist government has set out deliberately to conquer a sovereign people in a neighboring state... North Vietnam's commitment to seize control of the South is no less total than was the commitment of the regime in North Korea in 1950... the planners in Hanoi have tried desperately to conceal their hand. They have failed and their aggression is as real as that of an invading army."
The 1965 Bandy World Championship was won by the Soviet Union. The Soviets had effectively clinched the championship with the defeat of Norway, 4–0, on February 24.

February 28, 1965 (Sunday)
The United States and South Vietnam announced that sustained bombing of North Vietnam, Operation Rolling Thunder, would begin during the coming week. 
As a result of the American announcement, North Vietnam's leaders ordered the evacuation of children and elderly residents from Hanoi and other major cities.
U.S. aircraft made their first attack on the Mu Gia Pass, the major supply route for the Viet Cong into South Vietnam, as Skyraider planes and Skyhawk jet bombers from the  made a massive strike.
An 8-year-old boy was killed and eight other people injured when a stock car, driven by NASCAR champion Richard Petty, flew off a drag strip and into a crowd of spectators. Most of the fans were able to get out of the way, but Wayne Dye of Austell died when the car struck him. 
James T. Aubrey was fired from his job as President of the CBS Television Network.  An announcement by CBS, Inc. President Frank Stanton praised Aubrey's "outstanding accomplishments" and said that Aubrey had resigned, but gave no explanation for the dismissal; press reports noted that "it was understood in the industry that the resignation had not been voluntary".
Born:  
Colum McCann, Irish novelist, in Dublin 
Park Gok-ji, South Korean film editor
Died: Adolf Schärf, 74, President of Austria since 1957. Chancellor Josef Klaus became the Acting President. New presidential elections would take place and Franz Jonas would be sworn in on June 9.

References

1965
1965-02
1965-02